Neuvéglise (Auvergnat: Nòvaglèisa) is a former commune in the Cantal department in south-central France. On 1 January 2017, it was merged into the new commune Neuvéglise-sur-Truyère.

Population

See also
Communes of the Cantal department

References

Former communes of Cantal
Cantal communes articles needing translation from French Wikipedia
Populated places disestablished in 2017